The finals and the qualifying heats of the men's 200 metres freestyle event at the 1998 World Aquatics Championships were held on Monday 12 January 1998 in Perth, Western Australia.

A Final

B Final

Qualifying heats

See also
1996 Men's Olympic Games 200m Freestyle (Atlanta)
1997 Men's World SC Championships 200m Freestyle (Gothenburg)
1997 Men's European LC Championships 200m Freestyle (Seville)
2000 Men's Olympic Games 200m Freestyle (Sydney)

References

Swimming at the 1998 World Aquatics Championships